Euphorbia didiereoides is a species of plant in the family Euphorbiaceae. It is endemic to Madagascar.  It is threatened by habitat loss.

References

Endemic flora of Madagascar
didiereoides
Endangered plants
Taxonomy articles created by Polbot